Champagnac-la-Prune is a commune in the central French department of Corrèze.

Population

See also
Communes of the Corrèze department

References

Communes of Corrèze